Charles Robert Pimlott (born 25 February 1979) is an English barrister and a former first-class cricketer.

Pimlott was born at Stockport and was educated at Stockport Grammar School, before going up to Downing College, Cambridge to study law. While at Cambridge he made his debut in first-class cricket for Cambridge University against Lancashire at Fenner's in 1999. He made six first-class appearances for Cambridge in 1999, alongside four in 2000. He also played in one first-class match for the British Universities cricket team in 2000, against the touring Zimbabweans. Across his eleven appearances at first-class level, Pimlott scored 72 runs with a high score of 31 not out, alongside 17 wickets with his right-arm fast-medium bowling, taken at an average of 34.47, with best figures of 3 for 10. He played briefly for Lincolnshire in minor counties cricket, making one appearance against the Nottinghamshire Cricket Board in the 2001 MCCA Knockout Trophy.

After graduating from Cambridge, Pimlott was called to the bar in 2001 as a member of the Middle Temple. He currently practices as a barrister specialising in construction and energy disputes, insurance, professional negligence, and commercial litigation.

References

External links

1979 births
Living people
People from Stockport
People educated at Stockport Grammar School
Alumni of Downing College, Cambridge
English cricketers
Cambridge University cricketers
British Universities cricketers
Lincolnshire cricketers
English barristers
Members of the Middle Temple